Pristimantis dundeei is a species of frog in the family Strabomantidae. It is found in Bolivia and Brazil near its type locality, Chapada dos Guimarães, Mato Grosso. Its natural habitats are gallery forests in the Cerrado savanna. Its status is insufficiently known.

References

dundeei
Amphibians of Bolivia
Amphibians of Brazil
Amphibians described in 1999
Taxonomy articles created by Polbot